is the second film adaptation of the Kamen Rider W television series, directed by Koichi Sakamoto and released in Japanese theaters on August 7, 2010. It was filmed in 3D, making it the first feature length 3D film in the Kamen Rider franchise. The film's main guest star is Mitsuru Matsuoka of the band SOPHIA, who stars as the film's antagonist Katsumi Daido / Kamen Rider Eternal; other guest stars include Genki Sudo and Aya Sugimoto. Following the tradition of previous Heisei Kamen Rider movies, Kamen Rider W Forever was released as a double-bill with the Super Sentai franchise film Tensou Sentai Goseiger: Epic on the Movie. Additionally, the titular protagonist of Kamen Rider OOO made his first appearance in the film.

Set between episodes 44 and 45 of the series, the film focuses on an invasion organized by the  led by Daido, after they discover Foundation X's . Assisted by Interpol investigator Maria S. Cranberry, Shotaro Hidari and Philip's investigation into NEVER leads to unforeseen events and secrets being revealed.

Synopsis
After picking up the T2 Gaia Memories from Jun Kazu, Foundation X agent Tabata leaves the city of Fuuto for his organization's headquarters, only to be attacked by Katsumi Daido, leader of the terrorist organization NEVER, who steals the Eternal Memory and transforms into Kamen Rider Eternal. Tabata activates the Memories' case's self-destruct sequence, killing himself and scattering the remaining Memories throughout Fuuto while Daido reunites with his allies (Kyosui Izumi, Reika Hanehara, Gozo Domoto, and Ken Ashihara) who find four of the Memories and turn into Dopants.

Sometime later, Philip becomes curious about mother-child relationships due to his last encounter with Shroud before witnessing two previously defeated Dopants attacking people. While Philip holds the monsters off, a woman reminiscent of Shroud assists him until his partner Detective Shotaro Hidari arrives so they can transform into Kamen Rider W and defeat the monsters while the Cyclone Dopant saves the civilians. Upon reverting to human form, "Watcherman" and "Santa-chan" reveal they were forcibly transformed by strange Gaia Memories before the woman reappears and introduces herself as Maria S. Cranberry, who claims to be an Interpol agent sent to investigate NEVER and the T2 Memories. While comparing notes, Philip becomes intrigued by Maria and believes she is Shroud.

Hidari, Philip, and their allies recover 17 more T2 Memories, but Hanehara, Izumi, and Domoto attack them until the Cyclone Dopant rescues them. While conducting research into NEVER, Philip discovers its members are actually undead super-soldiers called "Necro-Overs" before receiving a call from Maria telling him to bring the T2 Memories he found to the Fuuto Tower. Philip arrives but is briefly captured by Daido. Hidari and Philip fight Daido while their ally Ryu Terui fights Ashihara, but the trio are overpowered by their opponents before Daido uses his Memory's power to negate non-T2 Memories, de-powering the trio. Maria reveals herself as the Cyclone Dopant, having found the T2 Cyclone Memory, and her true allegiance with Daido to the trio before joining NEVER in converting Fuuto Tower into the X-Bicker device so they can turn Fuuto's citizens into Necro-Overs. While recovering, Terui informs his allies that NEVER is offering a reward for the last missing Memory, which has caused anarchy in Fuuto. Hidari and Philip argue over whether Maria can be trusted before Philip goes to find her. When he does, he asks her if she is Shroud before Daido reveals she is the latter's mother before knocking him out.

Returning to his office, Hidari finds Kamen Rider Skull leaving behind his Lost Driver, making the former realize Philip wants a family of his own. Hanehara finds and attacks Hidari again, and reveals Daido has Philip. In the ensuing struggle, Hidari finds the last T2 Memory, uses it with the Lost Driver to transform into Kamen Rider Joker, and defeats Hanehara. After being joined by Terui, Hidari heads to Fuuto Tower to save Philip and stop NEVER, defeating Domoto along the way. While Terui fights Izumi and Ashihara, killing the latter in the process, Hidari finds and reconciles with Philip, but loses his T2 Memory to Daido, who uses all of the T2 Memories to activate the X-Bicker. A dying Hanehara returns to beg for Daido's help, but he rebuffs her as she and Domoto turn to dust. Outraged by this, Philip destroys the X-Bicker and negates the T2 Memories through willpower before Maria injects Daido with an anti-Necro-Over solution. Enraged, he fatally shoots her before escaping to take an antidote. Maria apologizes to Philip for using him and assures him that he can stop Daido.

Hidari and Philip pursue Daido, but are stopped by Izumi until Eiji Hino suddenly appears and fights him. As Hino kills Izumi, Hidari and Philip confront Daido, who intends to use the X-Bicker's energy to reactivate the T2 Memories and destroy Fuuto. He knocks the pair off the tower, but they receive a power boost, return to Daido, and kill him. As Fuuto celebrates NEVER's defeat, repairs to Fuuto Tower begin.

In an end credits scene, a mysterious person covered in bandages is seen in a bathroom.

Spin-Offs

Kamen Rider W Forever: From A to Z, 26 Rapid-Succession Roars of Laughter
Following the trend started with Kamen Rider Kiva, 26 comedy-themed shorts (one for every letter of the alphabet) were released online to promote W Forever. Titled , the shorts were released every Friday from July 16, 2010.

There were five different formats for the web movies:
, which features Shotaro, Phillip, Akiko, and Terui in drawing-based trivia contests.
: Shroud and Akiko examine where Kamen Rider designs, including a sneak-peak at Kamen Rider OOO.
: Jinno and Makura examine and test different Gaia Memories, including ones that were never fully shown in the TV series (such as Bean and Queen).
: Kirihiko (Yuki Kimisawa) talks to the other antagonists of the series in spite of his demise.
: Isaka (Tomoyuki Dan) examines Dopant designs.

The Beginning of N/Blood and Dream 
The short story  written by Riku Sanjo and published in Toei Hero Max, Vol. 34, explores NEVER's background and Maria's past as Daido's mother .

Kamen Rider W Returns: Kamen Rider Eternal 

At a press conference to promote the film, Mitsuru Matsuoka stated that he would like to have a spin-off television series or film focusing on the characters of NEVER some time after the next television series. Later, Daido and NEVER returned as part of the Kamen Rider W Returns direct-to-DVD duology. In the second film set after the events of Kamen Rider W Forever, Kamen Rider Eternal, Shotaro and Phillip encounter a young woman with psychic powers who tries to avenge Daido's death. Through her, they soon discover the truth behind Daido's attack on Fuuto and how he and the NEVER team were once heroes.

Reception
The film opened across 460 screens nationwide—273 2D screens and 187 3D. On its first day of release, the film grossed an estimated ¥140,000,000 and placed second in box offices. The movie grossed ¥331,179,000 and placed third on the weekend charts. 251,270 tickets were sold in total with 115,123 of those being for 3D viewings. The movie received an 4.1 out of 5 aggregate score based on user reviews compiled at Yahoo! Japan.

Cast
 : 
 , Young Katsumi Daido: 
 : 
 : 
 : 
 : 
 : 
 : 
 : 
 : 
 : 
 : 
 : 
 : 
 : 
 : 
 : 
 : 
 : 
 : 
 : 
 : 
 Eita's mum: 
 Narration, Gaia Memory Voice, T2 Gaia Memory Voice: 
Cameos
 : 
 : 
 : 
 : 
 : 
 : 
 : 
 : 
 : 
 : 
 : 
 : 
 : 
 : 
 : 
 : 
 O Scanner Voice:

Theme song 
 
 Lyrics & Arrangement: Mitsuru Matsoka
 Composition: Keiichi Miyako
 Artist: Mitsuru Matsuoka
 In addition to portraying the character Katsumi Daido, Mitsuru Matsuoka also performs the film's theme song "W", which was set for release as a CD single and limited edition CD+DVD pack on August 11, 2010. The song's music video features footage from the film interspersed between scenes of Matsuoka singing and scenes of a young boy who has found the Jazz Gaia Memory and is later saved from several Masquerade Dopants by Matsuoka.

Notes

References

External links 

2010 films
W Forever
Films directed by Koichi Sakamoto
2010s Japanese-language films